Sylvan Beach, is a community located within Vashon, Washington in King County, Washington, on the west side of Vashon Island on Colvos Passage.  It is known as one of Vashon's walk-in communities, since most of the homes can only be reached by walking in from the road on the community's boardwalk.  Supplies and goods are conveyed to the homes using wheelbarrows.

Navigational hazard
Sylvan Beach is noted on navigational charts probably because of the old pilings which extend 100 yards out into Colvos Passage.  The piles are all that remains of a dock that served the Virginia V, the passenger-only, mosquito fleet, steamship ferry, that ran daily from Tacoma to Seattle.

Unincorporated communities in King County, Washington
Unincorporated communities in Washington (state)